Blue pigments are  natural or synthetic materials, usually made from minerals and  insoluble with water,  used to make the blue colors in painting and other arts. The raw material of the earliest blue pigment was lapis lazuli from mines in Afghanistan, that was refined into the pigment ultramarine. It was  widely used for painting in the Middle Ages and Renaissance. Since the late 18th and 19th century, blue pigments are largely synthetic, manufactured in laboratories and factories.

Ultramarine 
Ultramarine was the most prestigious and expensive of blue pigments. It was produced from lapis lazuli, a mineral whose major source was the mines of Sar-e-Sang in what is now northeastern Afghanistan.  It was transformed into a pigment by the Afghans beginning in about the 5th century, and exported by caravans to India. It was the most expensive blue used by Renaissance artists. It was often reserved for special purposes, such as painting the robes of the Virgin Mary. Johannes Vermeer used ultramarine only for the most important surfaces where he wanted to attract attention.   Pietro Perugino, in "The Virgin and Child with an Angel", on the Certosa de Pavio Altarpiece, painted only the top level of the Virgin's robes in ultramarine, with azurite beneath.

Cobalt blue 
Cobalt blue is a synthetic blue pigment that was invented in 1803 as a rival to ultramarine. It was made by the process of sintering, that is by compacting and forming a solid mass of material by heat or pressure without melting it to the point of liquefaction. It combined cobalt(II) oxide with aluminum(III) oxide (alumina) at 1200 °C. It was also used as colorant, particularly in blue glass and as the blue pigment used for centuries in Chinese blue and white porcelain, beginning in the late eighth or early ninth century.

Cobalt glass, or Smalt, is a variation of Cobalt blue. It is made of ground blue potassium glass containing cobalt blue. It was widely used in painting in the 16th and the 17th centuries. Smalt was popular because of its low cost; it was widely used by Dutch and Flemish painters, including Hans Holbein the Younger.

Egyptian Blue 
Egyptian blue was the first synthetic blue pigment. It was made from a mixture of silica, lime, copper, and an alkali. It was widely used in The Fourth Dynasty of ancient Egypt (c. 2613 to 2494 BC).

Cerulean blue 
The pigment Cerulean blue was created in 1789 by the Swiss chemist Albrecht Höpfner. Subsequently, there was a limited German production under the name of Cölinblau. The primary chemical constituent of the pigment is cobalt(II) stannate.

Han blue or Chinese Blue 
Han Blue (also called Chinese blue) is a synthetic barium copper silicate pigment used in ancient and imperial China from the Western Zhou period (1045–771 BC) until the end of the Han dynasty (circa 220 AD). Han blue and Han purple were used to decorate Han dynasty Hu dark grey pottery vessels.  They also appeared in Han Dynasty tombs, such as the Eastern Han Luoyang Mural showing Liubo players.

Prussian Blue 
Prussian blue is a dark blue pigment containing iron and cyanide produced by the oxidation of ferrous ferrocyanide salts. It was invented in Berlin between 1704 and 1710. It had an immediate impact on the pigment market, because its intense deep blue color approached the quality of ultramarine at a much lower price. It was widely adapted by major European artists, notably Thomas Gainsborough and Canaletto, who used it to paint the Venetian sky. It was also used by Japanese artists, including Hokusai, for the deeper blues of waves.

Azurite 
Azurite pigment is derived from the soft, deep-blue copper mineral of the same name, which forms from the weathering of copper ore deposits. It was mentioned in Pliny the Elder's Natural History under the Greek name kuanos (κυανός: "deep blue," root of English cyan) and the Latin name caeruleum. The modern English name of the mineral reflects this association, since both azurite and azure are derived via Arabic from the Persian lazhward (لاژورد), an area known for its deposits of another deep-blue stone, lapis. Azurite was often used in the Renaissance and later as a less expensive substitute for ultramarine. Lower layers would be painted in azurite, with the most visible portions painted in ultramarine. The drawback of the pigment is that it degrades and darkens over time.

Ultramarine blue  
In 1814, a French chemist named Tassaert observed the spontaneous formation of a blue compound, very similar to ultramarine, in a lime kiln at St. Gobain. In 1824, the  offered  a prize for the artificial production of the precious color. Processes were devised by Jean Baptiste Guimet (1826) and by Christian Gmelin (1828), then professor of chemistry in Tübingen; while Guimet kept his process a secret, Gmelin published his, and thus became the originator of the French synthetic ultramarine industry. At the beginning of the 19th century, the price of a kilogram of lapis lazuli was between six and ten thousand francs. The price of artificial ultramarine was less than eight hundred francs per kilogram.

The synthetic ultramarine color was widely appreciated by the French impressionists. Vincent van Gogh used both French ultramarine and cobalt blue  for his painting "The Starry Night" (1889).

List of inorganic blue pigments

This is a list of blue inorganic pigments, both natural and synthetic.:

Aluminum pigments

Ultramarine (PB29): a synthetic or naturally occurring sulfur containing silicate mineral -  (generalized formula) 
Persian blue: made by grinding up the mineral Lapis lazuli. The most important mineral component of lapis lazuli is lazurite (25% to 40%), a feldspathoid silicate mineral with the formula .

Cobalt pigments

Cobalt blue (PB28): cobalt(II) aluminate.
Cerulean blue (PB35): cobalt(II) stannate.
Cerium uranium blue

Copper pigments

Egyptian blue: a synthetic pigment of calcium copper silicate (CaCuSi4O10). Thought to be the first synthetically produced pigment.
Han blue: BaCuSi4O10.
Azurite: cupric carbonate hydroxide (Cu3(CO3)2(OH)2).
Basic copper carbonate: Cu2(OH)2CO3.

Iron pigments

Prussian blue (PB27):  a synthetic inert pigment made of iron and cyanide: C18Fe7N18.

Manganese pigments

YInMn Blue: a synthetic pigment discovered in 2009 (YIn1−xMnxO3).
Manganese blue: barium manganate(VI) sulfate.

Notes and Citations

Bibliography 
 
 
 

Pigments